La donnaccia is a 1965 Italian drama film directed by Silvio Siano.

Cast
Dominique Boschero as Mariarosa
Georges Rivière
Aldo Bufi Landi
Laura De Marchi
Nello Ascoli
Gianni Dei
Giacomo Furia
Renato Mambor
Lucile Saint-Simon
Piero Vida

External links
 

1965 films
Italian drama films
1960s Italian-language films
1960s Italian films